Wun Yuen Yut Hei Jeung (混元一气掌, Primordial Chaos One Chi Palm) is an alleged Taoist internal martial art which includes chi gung exercises, meditation, push-hands, and the Wun Yuen set of forms.  The style of Wun Yuen was founded in the Han Dynasty (206BC - 220AD) by two of the senior disciples of Taoist Master Lao Tzu, named Ngai Bak Yeung and Chiu Chi who developed the style in order to attain and develop the Six Unions.  The first five Unions involve focusing on co-ordination of the Body, Heart, Intention, Chi, Spirit, and Movement.  The sixth Union outlines the unifying of Movement and Void, that is, the co-ordination of the previous five Unions without the need to focus on them, actions become reflex.  This is the Taoist principle of Wu Wei or non-doing, action is spontaneous and effortless.

Wun Yuen Yut Hei means Primordial First Chi, or Original First Breath which refers to the primordial chaos that existed before the dualities of Yin and Yang were formed. Wun Yuen Yut Hei Jeung can also be known as  Hun Yuan Yi Qi Zhang (Mandarin), or WYYHG.

Chinese martial arts